Defending champion Robert Wrenn defeated Wilberforce Eaves in the challenge round, 4–6, 8–6, 6–3, 2–6, 6–2 to win the men's singles tennis title at the 1897 U.S. National Championships. A delegation of British players, including reigning Wimbledon champion Eaves, competed at this year's U.S. championships.

Draw

Challenge round

Finals

Earlier rounds

Section 1

Section 2

Section 3

Section 4

References 
 

Men's singles
1897